The 1891 New York state election was held on November 3, 1891, to elect the governor, the lieutenant governor, the secretary of state, the state comptroller, the attorney general, the state treasurer and the state engineer, as well as all members of the New York State Assembly and the New York State Senate. The election was a sweep for the Democratic Party ticket.

Party Conventions

Democratic Party 
The Democratic state convention met on September 15 and 16 at Saratoga Springs, New York. George Raines was temporary and permanent chairman. Roswell P. Flower was nominated for governor on the first ballot (vote: Flower 334, Alfred C. Chapin 43). William F. Sheehan for lieutenant governor, Secretary of State Frank Rice, Frank Campbell for comptroller, Treasurer Elliott Danforth, Simon W. Rosendale for attorney general and Martin Schenck for state engineer, were nominated by acclamation.

Republican Party 
The Republican state convention met on September 9 at Rochester, New York. W. W. Goodrich was temporary chairman until the choice of James M. Varnum as permanent chairman. Jacob S. Fassett was nominated for governor on the first ballot (vote: Fassett 514, James W. Wadsworth 85, Stewart L. Woodford 83, Philip Becker 52, Joseph B. Carr 33, Andrew D. White 1). John W. Vrooman for lieutenant governor; Eugene F. O'Connor, of Brooklyn, for secretary of state; Arthur C. Wade, of Jamestown, for comptroller; Ira M. Hedges for treasurer; William A. Sutherland, of Rochester for attorney general; and Verplanck Colvin for state engineer, were nominated by acclamation.

Socialist Labor Party 
The Socialist Labor state convention met on May 18 in Albany, New York, and nominated Daniel De Leon for governor; Frank Gesser, of Utica, for lieutenant governor; Frederick Bennets for secretary of state; James Withers, of Brooklyn, for treasurer; Henry Vitalius, of Troy, for comptroller; H. G. Wilshire, of New York City, for attorney general; and Charles Wilson, of New York City, for state engineer.

Prohibition Party 
The Prohibition state convention met on September 2 and 3 at Albany, New York. Henry Clay Bascom was temporary chairman. They nominated Joseph W. Bruce for governor; George W. Hallock for lieutenant governor; William E. Booth, of Geneseo, for secretary of state; Francis Crawford, of Mount Vernon, for treasurer; William W. Smith for comptroller; Henry P. Forbes, of St. Lawrence County, for state engineer; and Calvin S. Grosser, of Buffalo, for attorney general.

Results
The whole Democratic ticket was elected.

The incumbents Rice and Danforth were re-elected.

Attorney General Simon W. Rosendale was the first Jew elected to a state office in New York.

Notes

Sources
 Results in New York Red Book (1892; see pg. 480 for Governor; pg. 481 for Lieutenant Governor; pg. 482 for Secretary of State; and pg. 483 for Comptroller, Treasurer, Attorney General and Engineer)
 Result: The Tribune Almanac 1892
 Result in New York City: As Declared by the Aldermen.; The Official Statement of the Vote of the County of New-York in The New York Times on November 21, 1891
 The Republican candidates: The Candidates in The New York Times on September 10, 1891

See also
New York gubernatorial elections

1891
1891 New York (state) elections
November 1891 events